This is a summary list of magazine lists.

By audience

 Men's magazines
 Women's magazines
 Teen magazines

By country
 Lists of magazines by country

By language

 Esperanto
 Gujarati
 Hindi
 Kannada
 Malay
 Indonesia
 Malayalam
 Persian
 Tamil

By publisher

 ASCII Media Works
 MediaWorks

By topic

 Amateur radio
 Anomalous phenomena
 Architecture
 Art
 Bondage
 Cars
 Comics
 Computer
 Fashion
 Film journal
 Food and drink
 Gadgets
 Gaming
 Health and fitness
 Horticulture
 Interior design
 Literary
 Manga
 Music
 Pet
 Political
 Pornography
 Sci-Fi
 Trade magazine
 Travel
 Wildlife

Other

 List of magazines by circulation
 List of Japanese manga magazines by circulation
 List of house organs

See also
 List of magazines released by Marvel Comics in the 1970s

 
Trade Magazines